Mark Cooper may refer to:

Mark Anthony Cooper (1800–1885), American congressman
Mark Cooper (academic), senior research fellow for economic analysis 
Mark Cooper (footballer, born 1967), English football player for Leyton Orient F.C. and Northampton Town F.C.
Mark Cooper (footballer, born 1968), English football player and manager of Barrow A.F.C.
Mark Cooper (American football) (born 1960), former American football guard in the National Football League for the Denver Broncos and the Tampa Bay Buccaneers
Mark Cooper (artist) (born 1950), American multimedia artist
Mark Cooper (judge), New Zealand judge
Mark Cooper, the title character of the sitcom Hangin' with Mr. Cooper

See also
Marc Cooper, American journalist, author and blogger